Annie Marie Roseline Moniqui (born March 28, 1990 in Godmanchester, Quebec) is a Canadian weightlifter. She competed at the 2012 Summer Olympics in the women's 58 kg, finishing in 16th with a total of 190 kg.

References

External links
 
 
 
 

1990 births
Living people
Canadian female weightlifters
Olympic weightlifters of Canada
Weightlifters at the 2012 Summer Olympics
Sportspeople from Quebec
People from Montérégie